Dingwall railway station serves Dingwall, Scotland. It is located just south of the junction of the Far North Line and the Kyle of Lochalsh Line, and is managed and served by ScotRail. It is sited after Conon Bridge heading northbound, with the next station being either Garve or Alness.

History

The extension to Invergordon came on 23 March 1863. The I&RR was consolidated with the Inverness and Aberdeen Junction Railway on 30 June 1862. The operating name became the Highland Railway (HR) on 29 June 1865. Under Highland Railway ownership the current station buildings were erected in 1886 by architect Murdoch Paterson.

The HR became a constituent of the London Midland and Scottish Railway (LMSR) in 1923.

The main passenger services through the station were to Wick and Thurso and to Kyle of Lochalsh.

The Highland Railway built a small steam locomotive shed near the station and this continued in use by the LMSR and British Railways until closure at the end of steam locomotive operations in the area in the early 1960s. It was a sub-shed of the large Inverness facility.

The station formerly had two signal boxes to supervise the passing loop and junction between the two routes - both were however closed in 1985 when the Radio Electronic Token Block system was introduced by British Rail on the Far North Line.  The system was initially worked from a control centre at the station, with the line southwards planned for inclusion in the Inverness area resignalling scheme.  However, when the Inverness scheme was completed in 1988, RETB control was transferred to the new signalling centre there and one here was closed.  The junction points were altered so that they were (and still are) power operated - drivers of northbound trains use a plunger on the down platform to select the correct route, whilst southbound trains trigger the correct setting by occupying track circuits on the approach to the station.

Historic Scotland designate the current station and platforms as Category B.

The town's name in Scottish Gaelic is Inbhir Pheofharain; however, the Gaelic on the station sign read Inbhirpheofharain (incorrectly written as one word). Transport Scotland acknowledged the error and indicated that the correct signage would be erected during 2014. The signage is now corrected.

Accidents and incidents
In 1897, an evening train from Dingwall heading towards Garve stopped short of a summit, and the rear coaches of the train ran back down the steep ascent towards Dingwall, as the coupling failed. They stopped just before reaching the junction to the north of the station. The only damage was to some level crossing gates, which were demolished by the coaches.

On 22 January 2010, a Class 158 Express Sprinter unit (158701) working the 17:15 Inverness to  service derailed at Dingwall; nobody was badly injured, but one female passenger was taken to hospital as a precaution.

Facilities

Both platforms have benches and help points, with most of the main facilities sited on platform 1, being a concourse, a disabled toilet, ticket office, and a bar. There is a small car park (adjacent to which is a payphone) and bike racks next to platform 1. Platform 2 also has a waiting room and a shelter. Both platforms have step-free access. New annunciator LED screens have been installed on both platforms, giving information on the next three trains to arrive, and general security information.

Platform layout 
Platform 1 on the northbound line can accommodate trains having eight coaches, whereas platform 2 on the southbound line can hold ten.

Passenger volume 

The statistics cover twelve month periods that start in April.

Services
As Dingwall is a key station on the Far North Line, all trains stop here regardless of destination.

On weekdays and Saturdays, the station sees 7 trains northbound (4 to Wick via Thurso, 1 to Invergordon, 1 to Ardgay, 1 to Tain), 4 trains westbound to Kyle of Lochalsh, and 14 trains southbound to Inverness. On Sundays, the station sees 5 trains northbound (1 to Wick, 3 to Tain, 1 to Invergordon), 1 train westbound to Kyle of Lochalsh, and 6 trains southbound to Inverness.

References

Bibliography 

 

 
 

Railway stations in Highland (council area)
Railway stations in Great Britain opened in 1862
Railway stations served by ScotRail
Former Highland Railway stations
Listed railway stations in Scotland
Category B listed buildings in Highland (council area)
1862 establishments in Scotland
Dingwall